Mignot Debebe (born 2 September 1995) is an Ethiopian professional footballer who plays as a centre-back for Ethiopian Premier League club Saint George and the Ethiopia national team.

Career
Born in Arba Minch, Ethiopia, Debebe began his senior career with Dedebit, followed with stints at Adama City and Hawassa City. He joined Saint George in 2021.

International career
Debebe made his international debut with the Ethiopia national team in a 0–0 friendly tie with Sierra Leone on 26 August 2021.

References

External links
 
 

1995 births
Living people
Sportspeople from Southern Nations, Nationalities, and Peoples' Region
Ethiopian footballers
Ethiopia international footballers
Ethiopian Premier League players
Association football defenders
Adama City F.C. players
Hawassa City S.C. players
Saint George S.C. players
2021 Africa Cup of Nations players
Ethiopia A' international footballers
2022 African Nations Championship players